Deflection in chess is a tactic that forces an opposing piece to leave the square, rank or file it occupies, thus exposing the king or a valuable piece. It is typically used in the context of a combination or attack, where the deflected piece is critical to the defence. Deflection may be used as a gambit to cause an opponent's piece to move to a less suitable square.
Deflections are often used as part of a combination which may involve other types of chess tactics as well.
 
If the deflected piece happens to be an overworked piece then the opponent's defense instantly crumbles, making victory imminent to the one who employed the deflection.

See also
 Overloading
 Sacrifice

References

External links
 Chess Tactics Repository - Deflection - Collection of chess problems on deflection
 101 Chess Tips - Deflection - Relates deflection to an overworked piece
 Chess Guru - Learn how to use deflection in chess - A tutorial in the use of deflection to win games
 Chess Corner - Deflection - Shows several chess problems involving deflection

Chess tactics
Chess terminology